Ran Banda Seneviratne (died 5 December 2001) was a Sri Lankan lawyer, author, lyricist, television and radio presenter.

Early life

Ran Banda was born in the remote village of Maradankalla near Mihintale, in the Anuradhapura District. His father was a teacher and an ayurvedic healer known as Wannihamy. The idiomatic usage of language evident in his mature writing and speeches stand witness to the fact that he never lost touch with his village heritage. He sometimes called himself a Bayya (Hillbilly) from Mihintale and did so with a great sense of pride.

Mature Years

After qualifying as an attorney-at-law he practiced in Hultsdorf, Colombo. He was an active member of the Bar Association of Sri Lanka, notably representing Sepala Ekanayake, a Sri Lankan who gained international notoriety after hijacking an Alitalia Boeing 747 with 340 passengers on June 30, 1982.

He embarked on a career in broadcast presentation and was popular for his wit and choice of language as a television and radio personality. However in the 1990s, after likening a President's Counsel newly appointed by Chandrika Bandaranaike Kumaratunga to a donkey while he was on a State television program, he was prohibited from further participation at talk shows.

Mr. Seneviratne also gained fame as a lyricist and author both in Sinhalese and English, composing many memorable songs sung by the likes of Gunadasa Kapuge and Amarasiri Peiris. Many of his lyrics deal with social issues and strike a deeply personal note, drawing from his own cultural roots.

Ran Banda Seneviratne died in 2002 and his last rites were performed at Anuradhapura in accordance with his wishes.

Works

Lyrics
 Davasak Pala Nathi Hene (sung by Gunadasa Kapuge - links to the song as well as interpretation available below)
 Ula Leno (sung by Gunadasa Kapuge)
 Sumano (sung by Gunadasa Kapuge)
 Landune (sung by Amarasiri Peiris)
 Mariyave (sung by Gunadasa kapuge)
 Pabalu nage (sung by Gunadasa Kapuge)

Poetry

 Hithae Dukata Kiyana Kavi
 Nihanda Nimnaya

Non-Fiction

 A New Political Concept for Sri Lanka (1999)

Quotes

References

External links
 
 Interpretation of the lyrical symbolism in Davasak Pala Nathi Hene
 An online collection of writing including excerpts from his two books of poetry

2001 deaths
Sinhalese writers
Sri Lankan writers
Sri Lankan television presenters
Sri Lankan radio personalities
Sinhalese lawyers
Year of birth missing
Sri Lankan lyricists
Alumni of Anuradhapura Central College